Houma is the largest city in, and the parish seat of, Terrebonne Parish in the U.S. state of Louisiana. It is also the largest principal city of the Houma–Bayou Cane–Thibodaux metropolitan statistical area. The city's government was absorbed by the parish in 1984, which currently operates as the Terrebonne Parish Consolidated Government.

The population was 33,727 at the 2010 census, an increase of 1,334 over the 2000 census tabulation of 32,393. In 2020, the population estimates program determined 32,467 people lived in the city. At the 2020 census, its population rebounded to 33,406. Many unincorporated areas are adjacent to the city of Houma. The largest, Bayou Cane, is an urbanized area commonly referred to by locals as being part of Houma, but it is not included in the city's census counts, and is a separate census-designated place. If the populations of the urbanized census-designated places were included with that of the city of Houma, the total would exceed 60,000 residents.

Houma was rated as an "affordable" city by Demographias 2013 International Housing Survey.

 Etymology 
The city was named after the historic Native American tribe of Houma people, believed to be related to the Choctaw. The United Houma Nation is recognized by the state of Louisiana, but it has not achieved federal recognition.

History
Settled by the Chitimacha and then the Houma Indians prior to European colonization, Houma was soon named for the Houma Indians who were at Ouiski Point. Land claimed for the Houma Indians by the Spanish was not recognized by the United States after the Louisiana Purchase.

Present-day Houma was formed in 1832; the city was incorporated in 1848. The area was developed for sugar cane plantations in the antebellum years. Plantations were sited along the rivers and bayous in order to have access to water transportation.

Civil War
In 1862, four Union soldiers traveling by wagon from New Orleans to Houma were ambushed by several armed citizens. Two of the Union men were killed, and the other two were seriously wounded. In retaliation, Union officers brought 400 troops into Houma, and began a wholesale arrest of residents. In his 1963 book The Civil War in Louisiana, historian John D. Winters describes the following events:

The investigation of the murders lasted several days but failed to reveal the guilty parties. To frighten the citizens, the home of a Doctor Jennings was burned, two other houses were torn down, and the home and slave quarters of an outlying plantation were burned. The soldiers next began to seize sheep, cattle, mules, wagons, and saddle horses. Negroes began to desert their masters and to flock to the protection of the troops. The frightened citizens had no means of resistance, and many found it hard to stand by and see their country despoiled by a few hundred troops.

Reconstruction to present
Sugar cane continued to be important after the war and into the 20th century.

On January 24, 1970, an accidental gas explosion killed three people and caused extensive damage downtown. Latour's Jewelry Store was destroyed.

In 1984, the city and parish consolidated their governments. In 2008 Bill Ellzey, a columnist at Houma Today, wrote that area residents were often unaware of the Houma city boundaries as the city and parish governments had consolidated.

In late August 2021 Houma was struck by the intense eye-wall of category 4 Hurricane Ida causing widespread damage.

Geography

Climate
The climate in this area is characterized by hot, humid summers and generally mild, sometimes warm winters.  According to the Köppen Climate Classification system, Houma has a humid subtropical climate, abbreviated "Cfa" on climate maps.

Demographics

As of the 2020 United States census, there were 33,406 people, 12,612 households, and 7,970 families residing in the city.

According to the 2019 American Community Survey, the racial and ethnic makeup of the city was 62.1% non-Hispanic white, 23.3% Black or African American, 0.3% Asian alone, 0.1% some other race, 3.9% two or more races, and 4.3% Hispanic and Latin American of any race. At the 2010 census, the racial make up of the city was 67.46% White American, 20.62% Black or African American, 5.45% American Indian and Alaska Native, 1.71% Asian, 0.12% Native Hawaiian or other Pacific Islander, 0.68% from other races, and 1.87% from two or more races; Hispanics and Latin Americans of any race were 5.76% of the population.

In 2019, the median age was 36.8. Of the population aged 18 and older, they made 75.9% of the demographic; 8.1% of the population were aged 5 and under; 14.6% were aged 65 and older. The median income for a household at the 2019 American Community Survey was $42,949 and 23.8% of the population lived at or below the poverty line.

Education
Terrebonne Parish School District operates the city and parish public schools. Houma is home to Louisiana's second-oldest high school, Terrebonne High School. South Terrebonne High School was founded in 1961. H.L. Bourgeois High School, Ellender Memorial High School and Vandebilt Catholic High School are also in Terrebonne Parish. Southdown High School (originally Houma Colored High School) was constructed in the mid-20th century as a segregated school for black students, serving them exclusively from 1946 to 1969. After that the school was integrated as a result of 1964 civil rights legislation.

Culture
Houma and the surrounding communities are steeped in the French, Native, Cajun, African and Creole history of the region. Originally the region was colonized by French and Spanish who made their way south through Bayou Lafourche. In the late 18th century, numerous Acadians (later known as Cajuns) settled in the region. The Acadians had been expelled by the British from Nova Scotia during the Seven Years' War for their unwillingness to take a loyalty oath to the British King. The number expelled was about 15,000 in number, of which 3,000 eventually settled in this region. Others went to France. As the French, Spanish, Acadians and Native American people mixed over the decades, a unique Cajun culture was born.

The swampland around Houma resulted in the area being quite isolated from the rest of Louisiana and the United States well into the 1930. Outside influences such as radio and concomitant popular culture failed to penetrate Cajun culture, so Cajun culture and the use of French language in this region persevered much longer than in cities on the border of Cajun country, such as Lake Charles or Baton Rouge. Traditional Cajun culture in Houma includes the French language, Cajun cuisine, and celebration of Catholic festivals such as Mardi Gras. That folk culture remains evident today and attracts many tourists to the region.

In the 1970s, many South Vietnamese refugees emigrated following the reunification of Vietnam. They settled in Southern Louisiana to work as shrimpers, just as they had in Vietnam. A fairly significant portion of them settled in New Orleans, and many settled in Houma as well, in addition to elsewhere along the Gulf Coast. Many ethnic Vietnamese families still work at shrimping, as their families have for several decades.

Downtown Houma has been designated as an historic district and is listed on the National Register of Historic Places. It offers a downtown walking tour and attractions such as the Bayou Terrebonne Waterlife Museum, the Folklife Culture Center, the Regional Military Museum, Southdown Plantation, the Houma-Terrebonne Civic Center, monuments to local armed forces, and local eateries.

Although Houma is quickly changing, many residents in the surrounding communities continue to make their living from the Gulf as their ancestors did. They harvest shrimp, oyster, crab, fish, and engage in trapping, although more have shifted to work in occupations of the oil industry and shipbuilding. According to the United States Government Patent and Trademark Office, Houma, Louisiana was the site of the deepest oil well in Terrebonne Parish. 

Tab Benoit's Voice of the Wetlands Music Festival, established in 2005, takes place in Houma, annually in October.

Media
The local newspaper is The Courier, founded in 1878 as Le Courrier de Houma by the French-born Lafayette Bernard Filhucan Bazet. He first published it in four-page, half-French half-English editions. Sold to The New York Times Company in 1980, it is now part of GateHouse Media.

The Houma Times is located in Houma. The newspaper is a weekly publication with a website updated daily. It serves the Terrebonne, Lafourche, and St. Mary parishes. In 2014, Houma-based Rushing Media merged with Guidry Group, Inc., which had owned the publication since its inception in 1997.

The area's only local broadcast TV station, KFOL-CD, is located in Houma. KFOL, also known as HTV, produces a weeknight newscast, followed by local phone calls and guests. Other shows include Sportsman's Paradise and One on One. KFOL broadcasts in digital on channel 30.1. The statewide TV network LCN-TV produces original Louisiana programming which showcases Louisiana's entertainment, culture, talent and industry. LCN-TV is delivered to all media distributors. Debuted in 2007, LCN-TV continues to produce Louisiana TV shows for the U.S. 

The following radio stations are located in the Houma-Thibodaux metropolitan area:

Transportation

Good Earth Transit is Houma's parish bus system. It has five major routes and serves the surrounding suburban areas, including the small bayou communities and the city of Thibodaux.

Houma relies mainly on roads and personal vehicles as the main form of transportation. The major roads in Houma are:
 US Route 90 (Future I-49)
 LA HWY 311
 Tunnel Boulevard (LA 3040)
 LA 24 (locally called West Park Avenue (westbound) and Main Street (eastbound))
 LA 182 (New Orleans Boulevard)
 South and North Hollywood Road
 St. Louis Canal Road
 Savanne Road
 Valhi Boulevard

Notable people

 George Arceneaux, U.S. District Court judge from 1979 until his death in office in 1993
 Tab Benoit, blues musician and co-star of the IMAX movie feature Hurricane on the Bayou
 Sherman A. Bernard, Louisiana insurance commissioner from 1972 to 1988, graduated from Terrebonne High School in Houma
Elward Thomas Brady, Jr., state representative from Terrebonne Parish from 1972 to 1976; businessman
 Wanda Brister, operatic mezzo-soprano, presently on the faculty at Florida State University
 Joe Burks, professional athlete
 Leonard J. Chabert, member of both houses of Louisiana State Legislature from Terrebonne Parish; namesake of Leonard J. Chabert Medical Center in Houma
 Marty J. Chabert, former state senator from Terrebonne and Lafourche parishes
 Norby Chabert, current Republican member of Louisiana State Senate from Terrebonne and Lafourche parishes
 Richie Cunningham, professional athlete
 Allen J. Ellender (1890–1972), former president pro tempore and Democratic U.S. Senator
 Anthony Freeman, Catholic writer and religious
 Shane Gibson (musician), guitarist for Korn
 Skyler Green, gridiron football wide receiver and return specialist
 Johnny Hartman (1923–1983), jazz singer
 Hal Haydel, professional athlete
 Cyril and Libbye Hellier, operatic sopranos
 Brandon Jacobs, NFL running back
 Frank Lewis, professional athlete
 Morris Lottinger, Jr., former state representative and retired circuit court judge from Houma
 Morris Lottinger, Sr., state representative from 1936 to 1950, House Speaker from 1948 to 1950, and state circuit court judge until retirement in 1965
 Jesse Marcel, lieutenant colonel in the United States Air Force who helped administer Operation Crossroads
 Elijah McGuire, NFL running back for the New York Jets
 Jay Pennison, professional athlete
 Audie Pitre, bassist for Acid Bath, killed in a head-on collision in 1997.
 Lloyd Pye, ancient astronauts proponent
 Dax Riggs, frontman for Acid Bath, Deadboy and the Elephantmen, Agents of Oblivion, others
 Chloe Suazo, Actress
 Quvenzhané Wallis, young film actress (Beasts of the Southern Wild, 2012)
 J. Louis Watkins, Jr., judge of Louisiana First Circuit Court of Appeal from 1979 to 1997; former attorney in Houma
 Justin Williams (baseball), MLB Outfielder
 Tramon Williams, professional athlete

Twin towns
 Cambrai, Nord, Hauts-de-France, France
 Datça, Muğla Province, Turkey
 Bathurst, New Brunswick, Canada
 In June 2012, Terrebonne Parish signed a letter of intent to become a sister city with Weihai, China, for economic development purposes.

In popular culture
 Houma and the surrounding area are the setting for the Swamp Thing series of comic books.
 V. C. Andrews' novel Ruby (1994) is also set here.
 The Suicide Squad is based at Belle Reve in Houma.
 The 1999 films Crazy in Alabama and A Lesson Before Dying were filmed partially in Houma.
 The film The Skeleton Key (2005) is set in Houma and the nearby area of Bayou Gauche.
 Several scenes from the 2013 film, The Butler, starring Forest Whitaker and Oprah Winfrey, were filmed in downtown Houma.
 In 1992, Unsolved Mysteries profiled the case of Adam John "AJ" Breaux, a resident of Houma, Louisiana, who went missing in 1991.
 The Hulu TV series, The Act included a scene in Houma of a young Gypsy Rose Blanchard and Dee Dee Blanchard.
 The 2022 film Where the Crawdads Sing was filmed in and around Houma.

ReferencesNotesBibliography'''
 Cobb, Thomas Blum and Currie, Mara (2004) Houma. Arcadia Publishing 

 External links 

 Terrebonne Parish-Houma Consolidated Government
 Houma Today (website of The Courier'' newspaper)

 
Cities in Louisiana
Cities in Terrebonne Parish, Louisiana
Populated places established in 1810
Parish seats in Louisiana
Cities in the Houma – Thibodaux metropolitan area
1834 establishments in Louisiana